.cx is the country code top-level domain for Christmas Island. It is administered by the Christmas Island Internet Administration, through the Christmas Island Domain Administration Limited. The Christmas Island Internet Administration is a community-owned non-profit company which also provides Internet service to the island's residents. .cx is a member of the Council of Country Code Administrators, a group of country-code domains making use of common registry and/or dispute resolution services.

The top-level domain was formerly administered by Planet Three Limited, a company with offices in the United Kingdom and Australia, which went bankrupt and ceased operations, voluntarily transferring management to the Christmas Island Internet Administration (called Dot CX Limited at the time).  The local (shire) government of Christmas Island endorsed the transfer, but the Commonwealth of Australia (which has international authority over Christmas Island as an external territory) did not immediately approve it.  Australia has since published a memorandum of understanding which recognizes the Christmas Island Internet Administration as the legitimate manager of .cx.

The domain achieved a certain degree of notoriety when it was used for the shock site goatse.cx, to the point the Christmas Island Internet Administration was forced to take down the website following complaints by Christmas Islanders.

References

External links
 Christmas Island Internet Administration
 Council of Country Code Administrators
 IANA .cx whois information
 Christmas Island Domain Administration Limited 

Communications in Christmas Island
Country code top-level domains
Computer-related introductions in 1997